Sixteen people have served as president of Reed College, a liberal arts college located in Portland, Oregon, United States. Seven have served in the role of acting president. The institution was led by an administrative committee from 1919 to 1921 and from July to December 1924.

Presidents and acting presidents

References

Reed College presidents
Reed College
Reed College presidents